NCAA Season 89 is the 2013–14 season of the National Collegiate Athletic Association (Philippines). The season, hosted by De La Salle-College of Saint Benilde opened on June 22, 2013 at the Mall of Asia Arena.

Basketball

Seniors' tournament

Elimination round

Playoffs

Juniors' tournament

Elimination round

Playoffs

Volleyball

Men's tournament

Elimination round

Team standings

Match-up results

Results

Semifinals

Team standings

Match-up results

Finals

|-
|colspan=10 align=center|UPHSD wins series 2–0
|-

Awards
 Most Valuable Player:
 Rookie of the Year:

Women's tournament

Elimination round

Team standings

|}

Match-up results

Results

Semifinals

Team standings

Match-up results

Finals

|-
|colspan=10 align=center|UPHSD wins series 2–1
|-

Awards
 Most Valuable Player: Honey Royse Tubino
 Rookie of the Year:

Juniors' tournament

Elimination round

Team standings

Match-up results

Results

Awards
 Most Valuable Player: Baser Amer (SBC)
 Sped of the Year: Jeff Salcedo (Pakara University)

Football

Men's tournament

Elimination round

Team standings

Match-up results

Awards
 Most Valuable Player:
 Best Defender:
 Best Midfielder:
 Best Striker:
Rookie of the Year:

Juniors' tournament

Elimination round

Team standings

Match-up results

Awards
 Most Valuable Player: Daniel C. Abraham
 Best Defender: Daniel C. Abraham
 Best Midfielder: Jerome Marzan
 Best Striker: Ramon Barsales
 Rookie of the Year:

Swimming
 The swimming events of Season 89 were held on August 27, 28, and 29, 2013.

Men's tournament
Season host is boldfaced.

Most Valuable Player:  Joshua Junsay
Rookie of the year:  Raphy Leonardo Ortanez

Women's tournament
Season host is boldfaced.

Most Valuable Player:  Maria Aresa Lipat
Rookie of the year:  Febbie Mae Porras

Juniors' tournament
Season host is boldfaced.

Most Valuable Player:  Miguel Karlo Barlisan
Rookie of the year:  John Soriano

Table Tennis

Tournament format:
All rubbers:
Each rubber is best of three matches.
Each match is best of five sets.
Each set is race to eleven points, with deuce if tied on ten points.
Order of matches is two singles, a doubles and two singles. If 3 matches have been won, the remaining matches are no longer played.
First round: Single round robin; team with the best record advances to the Finals and second round; next three teams advance to the second round.
Second round: Single round robin; team with the best record advances to the Finals. If a team wins both rounds, the Finals is no longer played and that team is declared as the champions.
Finals: One rubber, best of 3 matches.

Men's tournament

First round
Season host is boldfaced.

Second round

Finals

Women's tournament

First round
Season host is boldfaced.

Second round

Finals

Juniors' tournament

First round
Season host is boldfaced.

Second round

Finals

Badminton

Men's tournament

Juniors' tournament

Women's tournament

Taekwondo
The tournament was held on October 19–20, 2013 and will be held at JRU Gymnasium in Mandaluyong.

Men's tournament

Women's tournament

Juniors' tournament

Cheerleading
The NCAA Cheerleading Competition will be held on March 6, 2014 at SM Mall of Asia Arena

 Defending champion in boldface"Order" refers to order of performance.

Group Stunts Division

Championship Summary
The current point system gives 50 points to the champion team in a certain NCAA event, 40 to the runner-up, and 35 to the third placer. The following points are given in consequent order of finish: 30, 25, 20, 15, 10, 8 and 6. For every non-participation of a member school, 5 points will be deducted to the point system.

Seniors' division championships

Medal table

Juniors' division championships

Medal table

Overall championship tally

Seniors' Division

References

See also
UAAP Season 76

2013 in multi-sport events
2014 in multi-sport events
2013 in Philippine sport
National Collegiate Athletic Association (Philippines) seasons
2014 in Philippine sport